Uiheung Ye clan is one of the Korean clans. Their Bon-gwan  is in Gunwi County, North Gyeongsang Province. According to the research held in 2000, the number of the Uiheung Ye clan was 9502. The founder was  who came from China. The time he came to Korea has been unknown.

See also 
 Korean clan names of foreign origin

References

External links 
 

Korean clan names of Chinese origin

Ye clans